Shanwei railway station is a railway station located in Haifeng County, Shanwei City, Guangdong Province, China, on the Xiamen–Shenzhen railway operated by the Guangzhou Railway Group.

Service  
Shanwei railway station was opened in 2013.

Railway stations in Guangdong
Rail transport articles in need of updating
Railway stations in China opened in 2013